Abukhovich is a Russian last name; a variant of Obukhov.

People with this last name
Philip Abukhovich, Voivode of Smolensk described in The Unknown War military history book by Hienadz Sahanovich

References

Notes

Sources
И. М. Ганжина (I. M. Ganzhina). "Словарь современных русских фамилий" (Dictionary of Modern Russian Last Names). Москва, 2001. 

Russian-language surnames
